Halesia diptera, the two-wing silverbell or two-winged snowdrop tree, is a species in the family Styracaceae, native to the southeastern United States from South Carolina and Florida west to eastern Texas. It is cultivated as an ornamental tree.

Description
It is a large shrub or small tree reaching 4–8 m tall. The leaves are deciduous, 6–12 cm long and 4–7 cm broad. The flowers are white, 2-2.5 cm long, produced in clusters of 3–6 together. The fruit is a dry (non-fleshy) drupe with two wings down the sides; this distinguishes it from the other species of Halesia, which have four wings on the fruit.

Wildlife, including squirrels, eat the unripe sour green fruit.

Varieties
There are two varieties:
Halesia diptera var. diptera
Halesia diptera var. magniflora R.K.Godfrey

References

diptera
Trees of the Southeastern United States
Trees of the South-Central United States